Hagen Kearney (born November 6, 1991) is an American snowboarder who competes internationally.

He competed for the US at the FIS Freestyle Ski and Snowboarding World Championships 2017 in Sierra Nevada, Spain, where he won a gold medal in the men's snowboard team cross, along with Nick Baumgartner.

He competed for the US at the XXIII Olympic Winter Games in Pyeongchang County, Gangwon Province, South Korea, where he placed 13th overall in the Men's Snowboard Cross.

References

External links
 
 
 
 
 

1991 births
Living people
American male snowboarders
Snowboarders at the 2018 Winter Olympics
Snowboarders at the 2022 Winter Olympics
Olympic snowboarders of the United States
21st-century American people